The song "I'm a Woman" was written by famed songwriting duo Jerry Leiber and Mike Stoller, and was first recorded in 1962 by Christine Kittrell.

Popular recordings
It was recorded and released as a single later that year by Peggy Lee, reaching number 54 on U.S. pop charts. It was also the title song to Lee's 1963 album I'm a Woman, and appeared on her subsequent albums In Love Again! (1964) and Is That All There Is? (1969).
There were two covers by Maria Muldaur; first with Jim Kweskin's Jug Band in the mid-1960s, then again as a solo performer in 1974. The latter reached number 12 on U.S. pop charts, and was Muldaur's only hit other than her signature song "Midnight at the Oasis".

Other recordings
It has been covered many times, other well-known versions include:
Bette Midler's from her Peggy Lee tribute album Bette Midler Sings the Peggy Lee Songbook 
Country legend Reba McEntire recorded "I'm a Woman" for her 1979 album Out of a Dream.
Nanette Workman recorded it for her 2001 Roots 'n' Blues album. 
Elisa Girlando and Out of Truth released a version in 2008. 
Country star Wynonna Judd recorded it for her 2009 album Sing: Chapter 1. 
A female ensemble version of "I'm a Woman" also was included in 1995's Leiber & Stoller-themed musical revue Smokey Joe's Cafe.
Brian May recorded a version with English band Woman and Kerry Ellis in 2020 as a charity single to help Breast Cancer Awareness Month. May also produced the single.

Popular culture
A duet by Raquel Welch and Miss Piggy from the former's appearance on The Muppet Show, with Raquel spelling the first two letters from the word "Woman" (W O) while Miss Piggy ended it with the letters "P I G"; 
Raquel Welch and Cher performed the song on The Cher Show in 1975.
A rendition of the Leiber & Stoller version was performed by Jane Krakowski, Vonda Shepard, and Lisa Nicole Carson in an episode of Ally McBeal. Later, Lucy Liu and Portia de Rossi lip-sync the song in a further episode of Ally McBeal. 
There were two performances by Melinda Doolittle on season 6 of American Idol. 
Beverly Hillbillies star Irene Ryan (in her Granny persona) performed an adaptation of the song on The Hollywood Palace on ABC-TV in 1969.
The song, with modified lyrics, was used in Enjoli perfume commercials of the 1970s. 
In 2013, Jennifer Love Hewitt released a new version of the song to promote her Lifetime TV show The Client List. The video reached the top 10 in the iTunes Music Video chart.

Chart history
Peggy Lee

Maria Muldaur

Notes

1962 songs
1963 singles
1974 singles
Songs written by Jerry Leiber and Mike Stoller
Peggy Lee songs